The Collection 3.0 is a compilation album by Italian singer Mina, released on 31 March 2015 by Warner Music Italy.

Overview
After the purchase of EMI, the label Warner Music Italy also acquired the rights to the catalog of Mina's songs. The success of the last two parts of The Platinum Collection prompted the label to release another one, which is why it is called The Collection 3.0. The compilation consists of three discs, each with 18 tracks. The album contains almost all the iconic hits of the singer from different periods of her career. Some of the songs were presented in an updated version, such as "Città vuota (It's A Lonely Town)" or "Il cielo in una stanza". Duet versions of some songs were also included on the album.

Track listing

Charts

Certifications and sales

References

External links
 

2015 compilation albums
Mina (Italian singer) compilation albums
Warner Music Group compilation albums